14 Pashons - Coptic calendar - 16 Pashons

Fixed commemorations
All fixed commemorations below are observed on 15 Pashons (23 May) by the Coptic Orthodox Church.

Saints
Saint Simon the Zealot
The 400 martyrs of Dendera
Saint Mina the Deacon and Anchorite

Sources
Coptic Synexarion

Days of the Coptic calendar